Doris Miller (October 12, 1919November 24, 1943) was a United States Navy cook third class who was killed in action during World War II. He was the first Black American to be awarded the Navy Cross, the highest decoration for valor presented by the US Navy, and the second highest in the United States after the Medal of Honor.

Miller served aboard the battleship , which was sunk by Japanese torpedo bombers during the surprise attack on Pearl Harbor on December 7, 1941. During the attack, he helped several sailors who were wounded, and while manning an anti-aircraft machine gun for which he had no training, he shot down 4–6 Japanese planes. Miller's actions earned him the medal, and the resulting publicity for Miller in the Black press made him an iconic emblem of the fight for civil rights for Black Americans. In November 1943, Miller was killed while serving aboard the escort carrier  when it was sunk by a Japanese submarine during the Battle of Makin in the Gilbert Islands.

The destroyer escort/Knox-class frigate USS Miller (reclassified as a frigate in June 1975), in service from 1973 to 1991, was named after him. On January 19, 2020, the Navy announced that a Gerald R. Ford-class nuclear powered aircraft carrier, CVN-81, would be named after Miller. The ship is scheduled to be laid down in 2026 and launched in 2029.

Early life and education 
Miller was born in Waco, Texas, on October 12, 1919, to Connery and Henrietta Miller. He was named Doris, as the midwife who assisted his mother was convinced before his birth that the baby would be a girl. He was the third of four sons and helped around the house, cooked meals and did laundry, as well as working on the family farm. He was a fullback on the football team at Waco's Alexander James Moore High School. He began attending the eighth grade on January 25, 1937, at the age of 17; he repeated the grade the following year due to poor performance, so he decided to drop out of school. He filled his time squirrel hunting with a .22 rifle and completed a correspondence course in taxidermy. He applied to join the Civilian Conservation Corps, but was not accepted. Miller worked on his father's farm until shortly before his 20th birthday. 

Miller's nickname "Dorie" may have originated from a typographical error. He was nominated for recognition for his actions on December 7, 1941, and the Pittsburgh Courier released a story on March 14, 1942, which gave his name as "Dorie Miller". Since then, some writers have suggested that it was a "nickname to shipmates and friends".

Naval career 
Miller enlisted in the U.S. Navy as a mess attendant third class at the Naval Recruiting Station in Dallas, Texas, for six years on September 16, 1939. Mess attendant was one of the few ratings open at the time to black sailors. He was transferred to  the Naval Training Center, Naval Operating Base, Norfolk, Virginia, arriving on September 19. After training school, he was assigned to the ammunition ship  (AE-1) and then transferred on January 2, 1940, to the Colorado-class battleship West Virginia (BB-48). It was on West Virginia where he started competition boxing, becoming the ship's heavyweight champion.  In July, he was on temporary duty aboard  (BB-36) at Secondary Battery Gunnery School. He returned to West Virginia on August 3. He advanced in rating to mess attendant second class on February 16, 1941.

Attack on Pearl Harbor 

Miller woke up at 6 a.m. on December 7, 1941, aboard West Virginia. He served breakfast mess and was collecting laundry at 7:57 a.m. when planes from the  fired the first of seven torpedoes that hit West Virginia. The "battle stations" alarm went off; Miller headed for his battle station, an anti-aircraft battery magazine amidships, only to discover that a torpedo had destroyed it.

He went then to "Times Square" on deck, a central spot aboard the ship where the fore-to-aft and port-to-starboard passageways crossed, reporting himself available for other duty and was assigned to help carry wounded sailors to places of greater safety. Lieutenant Commander Doir C. Johnson, the ship's communications officer, spotted Miller and saw his physical prowess, so he ordered him to accompany him to the conning tower on the flag bridge to assist in moving the ship's captain, Mervyn Bennion, who had a gaping wound in his abdomen where he had apparently been hit by shrapnel after the first Japanese attack. Miller and another sailor lifted the skipper, but were unable to remove him from the bridge, so they carried him on a cot from his exposed position on the damaged bridge to a sheltered spot on the deck behind the conning tower where he remained during the second Japanese attack. Captain Bennion refused to leave his post, questioned his officers and men about the condition of the ship, and gave orders and instructions to crew members to defend the ship and fight. Unable to go to the deck below because of smoke and flames, he was carried up a ladder to the navigation bridge, where he died from blood loss despite the aid from a pharmacist mate. He was posthumously awarded the Medal of Honor.

Lieutenant Frederic H. White had ordered Miller to help him and Ensign Victor Delano load the unmanned number 1 and number 2 Browning .50 caliber anti-aircraft machine guns aft of the conning tower. Miller was not familiar with the weapon, but White and Delano instructed him on how to operate it. Delano expected Miller to feed ammunition to one gun, but his attention was diverted and, when he looked again, Miller was firing one of the guns. White then loaded ammunition into both guns and assigned Miller the starboard gun.

Miller fired the gun until he ran out of ammunition, whereupon he was ordered by Lieutenant Claude V. Ricketts to help carry the captain up to the navigation bridge out of the thick oily smoke generated by the many fires on and around the ship; Miller was officially credited with downing at least two hostile planes. "I think I got one of those Jap planes. They were diving pretty close to us," he said later. Japanese aircraft eventually dropped two armor-piercing bombs through the deck of the battleship and launched five 18-inch (460 mm) torpedoes into her port side. When the attack finally lessened, Miller helped move injured sailors through oil and water to the quarterdeck, thereby "unquestionably saving the lives of a number of people who might otherwise have been lost".

The ship was heavily damaged by bombs, torpedoes, and resulting explosions and fires, but the crew prevented her from capsizing by counter-flooding a number of compartments. Instead, West Virginia sank to the harbor bottom in shallow water as her surviving crew abandoned ship, including Miller; the ship was later raised and restored for continued service in the war. On West Virginia, 132 men were killed and 52 were wounded from the Japanese attack. On December 13, Miller reported to the heavy cruiser  (CA-35).

Commendation 

On January 1, 1942, the Navy released a list of commendations for actions on December 7. Among them was a single commendation for an unnamed black man. The National Association for the Advancement of Colored People (NAACP) had asked President Franklin D. Roosevelt to award the Distinguished Service Cross to the unknown black sailor. The Navy Board of Awards received a recommendation that the sailor be considered for recognition. On March 12, an Associated Press story named Miller as the sailor, citing the African-American newspaper Pittsburgh Courier; additional news reports credited Lawrence D. Reddick with learning the name through correspondence with the Navy Department. In the following days, Senator James M. Mead (D-NY) introduced a Senate bill [] to award Miller the Medal of Honor, and Representative John D. Dingell, Sr. (D-MI) introduced a matching House bill [].

Miller was recognized as one of the "first US heroes of World War II". He was commended in a letter signed by Secretary of the Navy Frank Knox on April 1, and the next day, CBS Radio broadcast an episode of the series They Live Forever, which dramatized Miller's actions.

Black organizations began a campaign to honor Miller with additional recognition. On April 4, the Pittsburgh Courier urged readers to write to members of the congressional Naval Affairs Committee in support of awarding the Medal of Honor to Miller. The All-Southern Negro Youth Conference launched a signature campaign on April 17–19. On May 10, the National Negro Congress denounced Knox's recommendation against awarding Miller the Medal of Honor. On May 11, President Roosevelt approved the Navy Cross for Miller.

On May 27, Miller was personally recognized by Admiral Chester W. Nimitz, Commander in Chief, Pacific Fleet, aboard the aircraft carrier  (CV-6) at anchor in Pearl Harbor. Nimitz presented Miller with the Navy Cross, at the time the third-highest Navy award for gallantry during combat, after the Medal of Honor and the Navy Distinguished Service Medal; on August 7, 1942, Congress revised the order of precedence, placing the Navy Cross above the Distinguished Service Medal in precedence.

Nimitz said of Miller's commendation, "This marks the first time in this conflict that such high tribute has been made in the Pacific Fleet to a member of his race and I'm sure that the future will see others similarly honored for brave acts."

Return to United States and the war 

Miller advanced in rating to mess attendant first class on June 1, 1942. On June 27, the Pittsburgh Courier called for him to be allowed to return home for a war bond tour along with white war heroes. On July 25, the Pittsburgh Courier ran a photo of Miller with the caption "He Fought... Keeps Mop" next to a photo of a white survivor of the Pearl Harbor attack receiving an officer's commission. The photo caption stated that the Navy felt that Miller was "too important waiting tables in the Pacific" for him to return to the United States.

On November 23, Miller returned to Pearl Harbor and was ordered on a war bond tour while still attached to Indianapolis. In December, and January 1943, he gave presentations in Oakland, California, in his hometown of Waco, in Dallas, and to the first graduating class of black sailors from Great Lakes Naval Training Station. He was featured on the 1943 Navy recruiting poster "Above and beyond the call of duty", designed by David Stone Martin.

In February 1943, "mess attendant" was changed to the "steward's mate" rate title by the Navy. On May 15, Miller reported to Puget Sound Navy Yard at Bremerton, Washington, assigned to the newly constructed escort carrier  (CVE-56). He was advanced in rating to cook third class on June 1. The ship had a crew of 960 men, and its primary functions were to serve as a convoy escort, to provide aircraft for close air support during amphibious landing operations, and to ferry aircraft to naval bases and fleet carriers at sea. The Liscome Bay was the flagship for Carrier Division 24 which was under the command of Rear Admiral Henry M. Mullinnix. On October 22, Liscome Bay set sail for Pearl Harbor.

Death 
After training in Hawaii waters, Liscome Bay left Pearl Harbor on November 10, 1943, to join the Northern Task Force, Task Group 52. Miller's carrier took part in the Battle of Makin (invasion of Makin by units of the Army's 165th Regimental Combat Team, 27th Infantry Division) which had begun on November 20. The carrier's own torpedoes and aircraft bombs exploded, causing the ship to sink in 23 minutes. There were 272 survivors from the crew of over 900, but Miller was among the two-thirds of the crew listed as "presumed dead". His parents were informed that he was missing in action on December 7, 1943. Liscome Bay was the only ship lost in the Gilbert Islands operation.

A memorial service was held for Miller on April 30, 1944, at the Second Baptist Church in Waco, Texas, sponsored by the Victory Club. On May 28, a granite marker was dedicated at Moore High School in Waco to honor him. Miller was officially declared dead by the Navy on November 25, 1944, a year and a day after the loss of Liscome Bay. One of his brothers also served during World War II.

Military awards 
Miller's decorations and awards:

Navy Cross citation 
For distinguished devotion to duty, extraordinary courage and disregard for his own personal safety during the attack on the Fleet in Pearl Harbor, Territory of Hawaii, by Japanese forces on December 7, 1941. While at the side of his Captain on the bridge, Miller, despite enemy strafing and bombing and in the face of a serious fire, assisted in moving his Captain, who had been mortally wounded, to a place of greater safety, and later manned and operated a machine gun directed at enemy Japanese attacking aircraft until ordered to leave the bridge.

Legacy

 Memorials
 Doris Miller Memorial, a public art installation honoring Miller on the banks of the Brazos River in Waco, Texas. Groundbreaking held in October 2015. A nine-foot bronze statue was unveiled on December 7, 2017, temporarily located at nearby Bledsoe–Miller Park.
 A bronze commemorative plaque at the Doris Miller Park housing community located near Naval Station Pearl Harbor; organized by the Alpha Kappa Alpha sorority and dedicated on October 12, 1991, which would have been Miller's 72nd birthday.
 Plaque in the Memorial Courtyard at the National Museum of the Pacific War in Fredericksburg, Texas.

 Schools
 Dorie Miller Intermediate School, Ennis, Texas
 Doris Miller Elementary School, San Antonio, Texas (opened 1947)
 Doris Miller Elementary School, San Diego, California (dedicated April 28, 1976)
 Dorie Miller Elementary School, Waco, Texas (closed 2012)
 Doris Miller Middle School, San Marcos, Texas

 Community-related (e.g. streets & parks)
 Bledsoe–Miller Community Center, recreation facility in Waco, Texas, jointly named for Jules Bledsoe
 Dorie Miller Community Center, recreation facility in San Antonio, Texas
 Dorie Miller Drive, Champaign, Illinois
 Dorie Miller Homes, a housing community in Gary, Indiana
 Dorie Miller Houses, a housing cooperative complex built in 1953 in the Corona neighborhood of Queens, New York
 Dorie Miller Park, Lewisburg, West Virginia
 Doris Miller Auditorium, in Rosewood Park in Austin, Texas
 Doris Miller Community Center, recreation facility in Newport News, Virginia
 Doris Miller Family YMCA, Waco, Texas
 Doris Miller Loop, Honolulu, Hawaii, with monument located at north end of street
 Doris Miller Memorial Park, a cemetery on the border of Waco and Bellmead, Texas
 Dorie Miller Recreation Center, San Antonio, Texas

 Military-related
 Bachelor Enlisted Quarters at Naval Station Great Lakes was dedicated in Miller's memory on December 7, 1971.
 Dorie Miller Galley, the main galley for Camp Lemonnier in Djibouti
 Doris Miller Dining Hall, located at Recruit Training Command, Great Lakes, Illinois
 Doris Miller Dining Hall, located at Naval Air Station Chase Field, Beeville, Texas
 Doris Miller Park, a housing community for military personnel in Honolulu
 , a future , announced on January 19, 2020.

Veteran-related
 Dorie Miller Chapter 14 – Disabled American Veterans chapter in Washington, D.C.
 Dorie Miller Post 546 – American Legion post in Racine, Wisconsin
 Dorie Miller Post 915 – American Legion post in Chicago
 Dorie E. Miller Post 817 – American Legion post in Beaumont, Texas
 Doris Miller Department of Veterans Affairs Medical Center in Waco, Texas; includes monument and a road named Doris Miller Circle.

 Radio
 In 1942, Miller's actions were dramatized on the CBS Radio series They Live Forever.
 The April 25, 1944, episode of the CBS Radio series Columbia Presents Corwin, titled "Dorie Got a Medal", starred Canada Lee and Josh White in Norman Corwin's "jazz-and-jive opera" about Miller.
 On the December 9, 1945, broadcast of his ABC radio series Orson Welles Commentaries, Orson Welles presented a tribute to Doris Miller and spoke to his father, Connery Miller. Broadcast from the U. S. Naval Training and Distribution Center on Treasure Island, San Francisco, the program announced the naming of three theater complexes to honor three World War II heroes killed in action. Theater One was named for Doris Miller; the other two theaters were named for Medal of Honor recipients John Basilone and Edward O'Hare.

 Film & television
 Although he is not identified by name, Miller is portrayed by Elven Havard in the 1970 film Tora! Tora! Tora!.
 In Michael Bay's 2001 film Pearl Harbor, Miller is portrayed by actor Cuba Gooding Jr.
 Miller being awarded the Navy Cross was depicted in the 2019 film Midway.
 Season 5, Episode 10 of the science fiction television series The Expanse, set in the 24th century, shows an arrivals board at the Lovell City Terminal on Luna (the Moon) that shows the UNN Dorie Miller as “on time”.

 Other

 Founded in 1943, the Dorie Miller Foundation began giving an annual award in 1947 to an individual or group considered outstanding in the field of race relations. Recipients included Jackie Robinson, Jesse Owens, and Eleanor Roosevelt. The award later became the American Heritage & Freedom Award.
 The Gwendolyn Brooks poem Negro Hero (1945) is narrated from Miller's point of view.
 In 2002, Molefi Kete Asante included Miller on his list of 100 Greatest African Americans.
 Miller was honored by the United States Postal Service as one of four Distinguished Sailors, with a 44-cent commemorative stamp issued on February 4, 2010. Also honored were William Sims, Arleigh Burke, and John McCloy.
 Representative Eddie Bernice Johnson (D-TX) proposed bills in 2016, 2017, and 2020 that would have authorized the Medal of Honor for Miller. None of these bills were voted upon by either the House of Representatives or the Senate.

See also

 Elvin Bell
 Charles French

References

Further reading

External links

 USS West Virginia Action Report, for December 7, 1941, via Naval History and Heritage Command
 "Dorie Got A Medal" (audio) from April 25, 1944, via radioechoes.com
 "Orson Welles Commentaries" (audio) from December 9, 1945, via indiana.edu
 The Texas Experience – Tom Landry Presents Dorie Miller (video), Texas Archive of the Moving Image
 Doris Miller Memorial, Cultural Arts of Waco
 Part of his life is retold in the radio drama "Autobiography of a Hero", a presentation from Destination Freedom

1919 births
1940s missing person cases
1943 deaths
African Americans in World War II
United States Navy personnel killed in World War II
Attack on Pearl Harbor
Missing in action of World War II
People from Waco, Texas
People lost at sea
Recipients of the Navy Cross (United States)
United States Navy sailors
African-American United States Navy personnel